Brownsville is a suburb of the City of Wollongong. 

Brownsville was the location of the first settlement at Dapto. With the construction of the South Coast railway, Dapto developed around the railway station, which was further south. Brownsville was named after George Brown who received a grant of 300 acres, south of Mullet Creek, in 1833. His "Ship Inn" became the centre of the farming community.

References

Suburbs of Wollongong